Cheng Pei-pei (born 6 January 1946) is a Chinese actress, who is considered cinema's first female action hero. She is known for her performance in the 1966 King Hu wuxia film Come Drink with Me, as well as her portrayal of Jade Fox in the award-winning 2000 wuxia film Crouching Tiger, Hidden Dragon.

Career
Cheng moved to Hong Kong in 1962. In 1963, she began training at Shaw Brothers Studio through a recommendation by a family friend. Due to her Mandarin and dance background, she quickly worked her way up in the industry. In 1964, she made her feature film debut as Liu Qiuzi in the 1964 Taiwanese drama film Lovers' Rock. 

Cheng is perhaps best known for starring in the 1966 Hong Kong wuxia film Come Drink with Me, directed by King Hu. Set during the Ming Dynasty, it stars Cheng as Golden Swallow, a skilled swordswoman on a mission to rescue her brother. Cheng continued to play expert swordswomen in a number of films throughout the 1960s.

Cheng moved to Southern California in the 1970s to raise her children. She attended business school at the University of California, Irvine. During this period, she also taught Chinese dance. 

In 2000, she returned to international attention with her role as Jade Fox in Ang Lee's Crouching Tiger, Hidden Dragon. Cheng had befriended director Ang Lee when she was host of the Mandarin talk show, Pei-Pei's Time, on the Los Angeles–based TV station KSCI.

She followed this up with her portrayal of Long Po in the 2004 television miniseries Watery Moon, Hollow Sky, which was shown on Asian-American television as Paradise. She continues to work for Zhouyi Media in mainland China.

Cheng is the president of the King Hu Foundation.

Personal life
Cheng has four children. Her son Harry Yuan is a host on National Geographic, and her daughters Jennifer, Marsha, and Eugenia Yuan are all actresses. Cheng is Buddhist. She is fluent in Shanghainese, Cantonese, and Mandarin.

Filmography

Films

Television

References

External links
 
 
 
 
 Cheng Pei-pei entry at Lovehkfilm.com

 

1946 births
Hong Kong Buddhists
Chinese film actresses
Living people
Chinese television actresses
Actresses from Shanghai
Participants in Chinese reality television series